Rhodotorula cladiensis is a yeast species first found in the Florida Everglades.

References

Further reading

Sporidiales
Yeasts
Fungi described in 2011